C